José Francisco Mañuz Trigueros (born 29 December 1960) is a Spanish retired footballer who played as a central defender.

Football career
Born in Alicante, Valencian Community, Mañuz spent several seasons with local Hércules CF, making his senior debuts with lowly FC Jove Español San Vicente at the age of 17, which earned him a call-up to the Spain under-18 team. With Hércules he played five campaigns at the professional level, three in La Liga and two in the second division: his best output occurred in 1984–85 when he started in all of his 24 top flight appearances to help the club finish 15th, being the first team above the relegation zone.

From 1985 until his retirement nine years later, Mañuz competed almost exclusively in the lower leagues, the sole exception being with Deportivo de La Coruña. After finishing his career with Villajoyosa CF he had a very brief spell as manager, precisely with his last side.

References

External links
 

1960 births
Living people
Footballers from Alicante
Spanish footballers
Association football defenders
La Liga players
Segunda División players
Segunda División B players
Tercera División players
Hércules CF players
Orihuela Deportiva CF footballers
Deportivo de La Coruña players
CD Alcoyano footballers
Villajoyosa CF footballers
Spain youth international footballers
Spanish football managers
CF Gandía players